Corndale is a rural locality in the South Burnett Region, Queensland, Australia.

Geography 

The land use is a mixture of crop-growing and grazing on native vegetation.

History 
Corndale State School (sometimes written as Corn Dale State School) opened on 23 July 1912 and closed in 1959.

In 1956, the Methodist Church in Memerambi was relocated to Corndale where it opened in 1957. It was originally built in Memerambi in 1908 at a cost of £100. In 1977, it became Corndale Uniting Church.

Education 
There are no schools in Corndale. The nearest government primary schools are Wooroolin State School in neighbouring Wooroolin to the north-west and Crawford State School in Crawford to the south-east. The nearest government secondary schools are Wondai State School (to Year 10) in Wondai to the north and Kingaroy State High School (to Year 12) in neighbouring Kingaroy to the south-west.

Amenities 
Corndale Uniting Church is on Corndale Road.

References 

South Burnett Region
Localities in Queensland